The Grove Historic District is a national historic district which is located in West Whiteland Township, Chester County, Pennsylvania. 

It was listed on the National Register of Historic Places in 1984.

History and architectural features
This historic district encompasses ten contributing buildings and one contributing site that are located in the crossroads village of Grove, Pennsylvania. 

Notable buildings include the Grove Methodist Church, which was erected in 1888, the former one-room schoolhouse, which was built in 1870, the Grove Tavern, the Grove Church, and an old store.  The contributing site is the cemetery adjacent to the Grove Methodist Church.

It was listed on the National Register of Historic Places in 1984.

References

Historic districts on the National Register of Historic Places in Pennsylvania
Historic districts in Chester County, Pennsylvania
National Register of Historic Places in Chester County, Pennsylvania